J. Collis Jones (born July 3, 1949) is an American former college and professional basketball player. Born in Washington, D.C., he attended the University of Notre Dame, where he scored 1,367 points for an average of 16.1 points per game. He led the 1969–70 and 1970–71 squads in rebounding with averages of 12.4 and 13.1 rebounds per game, respectively. He was selected in the first round of the 1971 NBA draft by the Milwaukee Bucks and also in the 1971 American Basketball Association (ABA) player draft by the Dallas Chaparrals. He played exclusively in theABA, including for the Kentucky Colonels and Memphis Sounds.

References

1949 births
Living people
American men's basketball players
Basketball players from Washington, D.C.
Dallas Chaparrals draft picks
Dallas Chaparrals players
Kentucky Colonels players
Memphis Sounds players
Milwaukee Bucks draft picks
Notre Dame Fighting Irish men's basketball players
Power forwards (basketball)
Small forwards